Ross Maxim Boatman (born 3 March 1964) is an English actor, professional poker player and a member of the poker-playing group the Hendon Mob. He is known for the role of Firefighter Kevin Medhurst in the ITV drama series London's Burning from 1988 to 1995 and again in 2000. In 2021, he starred in ‘Stay Close’ on Netflix and also joined the cast of the BBC soap opera EastEnders as Harvey Monroe.

Acting
Boatman was born in Camden, London. After completing his training at RADA, Boatman began his acting career in fringe theatre. He began working as a television actor in 1988, appearing in an episode of The Storyteller ("The Luck Child") and Dramarama, before earning his best-known role as Fireman Kevin Medhurst in the long-running television series London's Burning. Boatman portrayed Medhurst in over 100 episodes between 1988 and 1995, and again in 2000. His other television roles include A Touch of Frost, three episodes of The Bill (in 2006 and 2 episodes in 2009), Murder in Mind, Dream Team, ITV's 2005 drama Planespotting. He appeared in the award-winning West End play Dealer's Choice by Patrick Marber. Boatman starred in a NatWest bank television advertisement in 2015 playing a father who struggled with his utility bills.

On the big screen, Boatman has appeared in the gangster film Hard Men and as a rock star in the comedy Bring Me the Head of Mavis Davis. He famously turned down a role in Lock, Stock and Two Smoking Barrels as he had just completed filming Hard Men and feared being typecast. More recently, Boatman has appeared in alongside Clive Owen and Charlotte Rampling in the Mike Hodges film I'll Sleep When I'm Dead. Boatman has maintained he has a preference for acting rather than poker, although he finds poker easier to profit from. In June 2021, his casting on the BBC soap opera EastEnders was announced. Boatman made his debut appearance as Harvey Monroe in July 2021. For his portrayal of the role, he won the British Soap Award for Best Newcomer.

Poker

In the 1970s, Boatman observed his older brother Barny playing poker against his friends at their house. He begged to become involved in the game, and although initially dissuaded by his brother, he sat down and played his first poker session. Barny went on to teach him in the mid-'70s, and by the age of 12 Boatman was gambling at "pitch and toss" behind his school gym. In the early 1980s, he regularly observed a poker game in his local pool hall, where he learnt the basics of poker strategy. Soon after he began playing poker events whenever he had the opportunity, and turned professional in 1992.

Together with his brother, Boatman began attending a poker game in North London run by Joe Beevers and Ram Vaswani. The four quickly formed an ongoing friendship, and began travelling to poker events throughout Europe together. This became such a regular sight that the four were later dubbed "The Hendon Mob". Ross and the rest of the Hendon Mob were invited by Nic Szeremeta to appear in the brand new Late Night Poker television series, and supported the then-questionable idea of using a hole cam to make poker into a spectator sport. He appeared in all 6 series of the show, but had his best run at the title in the second season. He reached the final by defeating Hemish Shah in the runners-up final to advance to the grand final, where he finished 2nd to Simon Trumper.

Like the rest of the Hendon Mob, Boatman has become a regular fixture at the World Series of Poker (WSOP), where he made his first final table in 2002 in the pot limit Omaha event. He finished 7th in the event, where he and Barny became the first brothers to make the same WSOP final table. In the same year he finished in the money of the $10,000 no limit Texas hold 'em main event, eventually going out in 34th place out of 631 entrants. Boatman has also had success in the European Poker Tour (EPT), where he made the final table of its largest ever event – the second grand final, finishing in 6th place for €140,000.

His titles include:
 FF 3,000 no limit hold 'em, Autumn Tournament 1999;
 £100 pot limit hold 'em, Christmas Cracker 2001;
 €300 pot limit Omaha, Austrian Masters 2002;
 £2,000 no limit hold 'em, European Poker Championships 2002;
 €400 pot limit Omaha, Irish Winter Tournament 2002;
 £200 pot limit Omaha hi-lo, British Open 2004.

In addition to the above, Boatman has written over 20 articles on The Hendon Mob's website and also authored a poker lesson for internettexasholdem.com. After 3 years of sponsorship by the Prima Poker Network, he is now sponsored by Full Tilt Poker. As of 2009, his total live tournament winnings exceed $2,000,000.

Boatman resides in Holloway with his children Billie Joe and Rocky Joe. He also has a daughter Alabama Rose.

Personal life
His partner is photographer Sarah Jeynes.

Filmography

Film

Television

References

External links
 Hendon Mob tournament results
 

1964 births
Living people
English male film actors
English male stage actors
English male television actors
The Hendon Mob
Male actors from London
People from Kings Cross, London
20th-century English male actors
21st-century English male actors
Alumni of RADA